Destra Garcia (born 10 November 1978) is a Trinidadian musician, singer and songwriter of soca music. She is also known by the mononym Destra. She is one of the most popular female soca artists in the world.

Biography

Childhood and early career
Destra Garcia was born in Laventille to Lloyd Augustin Garcia and Debra Garcia. Her paternal great-grandfather was from Venezuela. Her maternal great-grandfather was from France while her maternal great-grandmother was from Spain. The eldest of four siblings, Destra was raised in the community of Desperlie Crescent, Laventille directly east of Port of Spain, and attended Woodbrook government secondary school and St James Secondary School where she discovered her passion for singing and music. She not only won her school's Calypso Monarch title for five consecutive years, she composed every one of her songs.
Her musical roots came from her grandfather the late Frankie Garcia (Bourg Mulatresse, Santa Cruz), an island jazz musician. Her father Lloyd Garcia is an accomplished guitarist.

She joined a quartet called Psyke which disbanded after only one year. Following the demise of the group, Destra attended the School of Business and Management earning a diploma in Sales Management.

Music and recording career
In 1999 Roy Cape All-Stars took notice of her single titled Ah Have A Man Already with Third Bass and invited her to join the Roy Cape All-Stars band as one of the lead vocalists. She pursued a solo career briefly, but eventually joined the band Atlantik in late 2002. She remains the frontline singer for Atlantik and has forged a successful songwriting partnership with Kernal Roberts (until 2005 inclusive), churning out hits such as "Whe Yuh Want", "Negative Vibes" and "Bonnie & Clyde".

In 2003 Destra released her first album Red, White, Black which included her hit duet "It's Carnival" with fellow Soca artist Machel Montano. The song became the virtual anthem of Trinidad and Tobago carnival that year and is widely known throughout the Caribbean and by extension, the world .

Career highlights
Destra won the Carnival Road March title in 2003 at the Labour Day Carnival in Brooklyn, and also placed second in the Trinidad and Tobago Soca Monarch competition in that same year.

She is yet to win either the Carnival Road March or Soca Monarch title in Trinidad although she has come close in the Road March race, placing second in 2003, 2004 and 2009. Despite this, she has become successful in the local music industry, specializing in pop-sounding soca compositions as well as fusion music encompassing aspects of East Indian culture.

In 2006, Caribbean Beat magazine described Destra's music as "the kind of sound that a young person, living at the crossroads of cultures and technologies that is Trinidad and Tobago today, is likely to produce, and the breeziness of her music may well act as an antidote to the hard edge that often characterises life not only in Trinidad and Tobago, but in many other corners of the globe.

Also in 2006, the Digicel mobile telecommunications group named Destra as its spokesperson in a two-year endorsement deal.

=== Cultural influence ===
With Caribbean roots going back to Trinidad and Tobago, Destra Garcia values the tradition of her culture. As a young girl, she took after her father and grandfather in her musical interest. Her father was a guitarist, a western instrument influenced by the Middle Eastern Al-oud, and her grandfather played brass instruments, both utilizing common instruments true to the Soca traditional style. Destra started by experimenting with Calypso as well as R&B and gospel. She was recognized for her mastery in the Calypso style for five consecutive years in school. It was not until Destra was introduced to Soca that she would find her passion and place. Both originated in the Caribbean with Trinidadian roots. Soca, "Soul Calypso", was created by Lord Shorty to respond to societal interest changes. The music essentially was calypso with sexualized vocals and a faster pace. As we look into her musical content, one of her most popular songs, called "It's Carnival" talks about an annual event held in the Caribbean. This carnival happens to be the most significant event in the world.  One of her lines of the song, she states, "Carnival in T&T is so special to all ah we" where T&T is Trinidad and Tobago and she is expressing intrapersonal significance. The content of her songs typically pertains to her Caribbean roots, with this as one example.

As Destra further explored the genre, she reached both an overwhelming struggle. Destra Garcia wanted her fan base to grow but it was fundamental for her to stay true to her roots and her Caribbean culture. The struggle with this was that she knew that her traditional values might need to be compromised to allow for a more open mind when working with outside artists to grow to her full potential. She believes that with a larger audience, it would be easier to implement the less popular sounds of Soca, ultimately bringing the genre back from a pop version to its origin while allowing for more exposure than before. She also makes mention that the biggest setback she faces is the pressure she feels from Trinidad to stay within traditional confines of the Soca style. All in all, Garcia cautiously is proceeding into new grounds, responding to modernity in order to keep expanding her fan base. She mentions that she is hoping to be able to maintain exploring her artistic boundaries while still having her culture and Trinidadian fan base stay loyal.

Image

Destra Garcia is known as the Queen of Bacchanal, QoB for short, because of the excitement listeners hear in the inflection of her voice on radio talk-shows and because of her own Carnival-inspired event "Festival of Bacchanal". She also is known for having an alter ego named Lucy who is supposed to personify the more sexual aspect of Destra. In her song released in 2017, "Destra vs. Lucy", one of the lines sang is, "[Cause] I [will] sing like Destra, but still [work] it like Lucy" which tells listeners that Lucy is the sexual ego and Destra is the singing one. More detail on Destra's personalities can be heard on a comedic interview with the ego "Lucy" herself on a radio show called "Breakfast Party". In the interview Lucy reveals that Destra is "holding [Lucy] back,... [she’s] too safe" and Destra always watches what she says. This makes listeners view Destra as a more timid person which inflates Lucy's sexuality because of this gap.

Destra Garcia's sexual ego "Lucy" is speculated to come from Carnival in Trinidad. In her song "Lucy", she sings about growing up a good girl and good student but one day when she is exposed to Carnival she and her dancing starts to become very sexual. Today Carnival consists of woman masquerading and "showing off" their bodies through dance and revealing clothing which creates a lot of sexual tension and is what Destra probably seen on TV. The cause for Carnival in Trinidad to be so sexual is because of dominance of women who attend and their preference of highly sexualized dancing. Destra's fondness for her and her music being very sexual is greatly influenced by Carnival and she continuing to be erotic keeps Carnival "sexy".

Destra is famous for her style. Due to her radical clothing choices consisting primarily of revealing clothing such as tight, short pants, and low-cut bra tops, she has captivated audiences during her performances. On stage, Destra is wild and explosive in her movements and vocals, sometimes seemingly performing in her own world due to her passion. Destra has expressed her music and fashion choices as a merger between American punk rock and Soca. This mix is evident in the instruments used in Destra's music, as she frequently utilizes rock guitar acoustics with underlying Soca rhythms.
Her 2006 look "soca fabulous" has been created by local designers such as Meiling and Peter Elias. From a new "glam" hairstyle, to her bold, risqué wardrobe, Destra's new look has been described as one which "is going to rock the town and will be a fashion force to reckon with."

Relation to Soca 
Over the past two decades soca music has transformed and revolutionized the Trinidadian music scene. Lord Shorty, Trinidadian calypso and soca musician created the term in the late 1970s spelling it "sokah" and said it was meant to be a blend of calypso with East Indian music. "In addition to succeeding in making Africans and East Indians come together as a unit, soca also promotes a sense of nationalism and unity for the country of Trinidad as a whole".[1] Soca brings Trinidad as a country together and through the music Trinidadians are able to express themselves and their cultural pride. "The majority of popular dance songs during Trinidadian carnival today would be described as Soca as opposed to Calypso and that is due to soca being established as the dominant form of carnival music by the calypsonian singer Super Blue in the 1990s who sang and led the most popular road march three years in a row. Super Blue ultimately established a new model for carnival music that emphasized more dance, faster tempos, and energetic rhythmic vocalizations".[2] Essentially calypso and soca soon eventually began to go their separate way and became clearly distinguishable from one another with calypso tending to be more reserved music sung in a calypso tent and soca being associated with road and street festivals. Furthermore, calypso is characterized by long narrative texts while soca lyrics are usually built in short phrases that don't necessarily have to form a logical narrative. In addition, soca is often heard alongside electronic studio effects which are never used in calypso. Trinidadian singer and songwriter of Soca music Destra Garcia can be seen exhibiting elements of soca through her quick movements along with her swift vocals while performing with the use of lights and electronic studio effects in the background.

[1] Guilbault, Jocelyne. Governing Sound, The Cultural Politics of Trinidad’s Carnival Music. Chicago. The University of Chicago Press. 2007. Print.

[2] Dudley, Shannon. Carnival Music in Trinidad Experiencing Music, Expressing Culture. New York. Oxford University Press. 2004. Print.

Social media, style, and performance
Destra is one of the leading ladies of soca music. The Queen of Bacchanal expresses that "At Carnival you are studying so much more: the audiences what people are saying about you what you are doing what you are wearing". Not only do blogs about Destra revere her musical talent, they also express admiration for her physique, in particular her fit abs.  Her defined abdominals have also become part of Destra's celebrity persona that fans think of when they think Destra Garcia. One blogger exclaims 'I will admit I am extremely jealous of dem abs, I wish mines was like dat but I guess I hadda wuk rel hard'. The tumblr page named 'Triniwoodentertainment' provides images of the star's activity with captions utilizing the same admiring tone such as 'Check out the soca songstress and Queen of Bacchanal, Destra Garcia showing off her abs and curves figure on a scorching hot Sunday. Fit to be a Queen, indeed.' This caption is for a picture of a bikini-clad Destra Garcia enjoying the sun. The blog's post includes a link to the image which is originally from Destra's official instagram.

Garcia is very active on the social media scene, with a Twitter, Instagram, and Facebook account. She states, "Everybody is experimenting to see if we could take soca to another level. I think soca is already good, I’ve decided to see if I can make it more marketable." Her activity on social media has certainly allowed her to not only connect more with her fanbase but also cultivate a community around her music. In an interview with Huffingtonpost, we learn that "while many popular figures have social media managers, Destra sees things differently. Therefore, to build a level of authenticity, she believes that it is imperative that she does it herself." Hence, every post, comment, 'like', tweet, retweet, etc. on the Destra Garcia social media sites are from the queen herself!

The Queen of Bacchanal believes that when it comes to artists,  "At Carnival you are studying so much more: the music, audiences, what people are saying about what you are doing, what you are wearing". Destra is famous for her music and fashion style which she describes as 'a merger between American punk rock and Soca'. It is a style that transcends the traditional and modernity. Similarly, Malian West African and Blues singer and songwriter Kar Kar's personal style was also influenced by the American Rock n' Roll era. The YouTube clip titled 'Destra Garcia Live at Soca on De Hill 2015' is a live performance that exhibits her wardrobe style and the explosive, engaging energy she emits on stage. Destra wears a black leather jacket with fringes along the sleeves and pink Doctor Marten boots. These pieces can be described as American punk rock. She is also wearing revealing, extremely short spandex shorts that allow her to maneuver and dance effortlessly with a potential partner to the soca music. Destra captivates the crowd by trying to instruct a male fan from the audience on how to dance with her on stage. She places his hands on the side of her hips and demands 'Now you have to listen to me'.  Destra is authoritative and fiery in her dance directions and quickly loses patience with this first potential male dance partner. The failing dancing attempt lightens the mood with its comical aspect. When he fails to follow the rest of her instructions, she exclaims 'I can't teach you nothing' and  'you have to listen to what I say'. Nonetheless she dismisses him with a hug then gestures 'Off Off Off!’.  In order to keep the show moving forward she quickly calls two more men from the crowd on stage and warns 'I don’t like men that are slow'. The man that moves his hips well to the soca music pleases Destra and she proceeds to dance with him. This performance showcases Destra Garcia’s fiery personality and her ability to transcend through the traditional and modernity in soca. She dances traditionally to soca alongside her male dance partner. However, Destra breaks out of the traditional 'passive female role' by taking on the authoritative role of not only leading in the dance but also verbally commanding her male dance partner's movements. Destra’s confidence and dominance are aspects of her captivating persona that make her a strong, dynamic female figure in the male-dominated soca music genre.

Albums and notable singles
Destra's released her first album in 2003, entitled Red, White, Black. Her second album, Laventille pre-release, which featured her Bonnie and Clyde hit song, was released in 2004.
Destra is well known for one of the most popular soca anthems "It's Carnival" (featuring Machel Montano) which was released in the 2003 Carnival season. Some of her later popular releases are  "Come Beta" (featuring Shurwayne Winchester), and 2005 singles "Fly" and "We Say So". She also paid tribute to her home town in 2005 with a track entitled "The Hammer Revisited", a duet with Calypso veteran David Rudder.
In 2006, Destra contributed her vocals to the song "Aur Chale" in conjunction with the band Dil E Nadan, and released popular songs such as "Max It Up" and "Independent Ladies."  She also released a song called "Jumpin'" later that year for her album "Independent Lady" which seemed to have signalled the start for women's shout for independence.
For 2007, Garcia has released the following singles thus far: "Las Lap" featuring Naya George, "Soca or Die", "Sign", "Situation" with Multi Symptom, the "made-for-pan" production "We Luv Carnival", the most popular song of her 2007 releases, "I Dare You" (the song in which she began utilizing the ever-popular dance created by Reggae Superstar Tony Matterhorn, "Dutty Wine"), all of which now form part of her "Soca Or Die" album released in 2008. Hott (2009) It was released for Barbados Soca. Destra's song, "Bonnie and Clyde", was featured as the track for the Parrot Bay alcohol commercial.

Awards and nominations

Albums

Singles

References

External links 

Soca musicians
21st-century Trinidad and Tobago women singers
21st-century Trinidad and Tobago singers
Living people
1982 births
Trinidad and Tobago people of Dougla descent
Trinidad and Tobago people of Grenadian descent